Live at Carnegie Hall is a live album by Anoushka Shankar released in 2001, and recorded at Carnegie Hall in New York and at the Salisbury Festival. The album earned a Grammy nomination for Best World Music Album.

Track listing
All tracks by Anoushka Shankar:

"Introduction"  – 0:28
"Raga Madhuvanti: Alap" – 9:57
"Raga Madhuvanti: Gat in Rupak (7-beat)"  – 8:36
"Raga Desh"  – 11:48
"Bhupali Tabla Duet"  – 9:52
"Raga Mishra Piloo"  – 18:57

Personnel 

Anoushka Shankar: Sitar, vocals
Bikram Ghosh: Tabla
Tanmoy Bose: Tabla

2001 live albums
Albums recorded at Carnegie Hall
Anoushka Shankar albums
Hindustani classical music albums